Kyösti Kallio's second cabinet was the 13th government of Finland from December 31, 1925 to December 13, 1926. It was formed between Agrarian Party and National Coalition Party, and had six ministers from each party. The cabinet lasted 348 days in office.

References

External links
Cabinet programme (in Finnish)

Kallio, 2
1925 establishments in Finland
1926 disestablishments in Finland
Cabinets established in 1925
Cabinets disestablished in 1926